The Underwater Artery in Thessaloniki, Greece, is a planned multilane stretch of expressway along the seafront of the city and 
underneath the seabed. Its purpose is to alleviate traffic problems within the city center.

Background
Proposals for the construction of the Underwater Artery have received heated debate since at least the early 90s. Proponents suggest that the project will create a bypass for most of the East-West car traffic, which currently has to cross the congested city centre (given that Thessaloniki is especially linear as a city). Opponents cite the high construction cost, question the efficacy of such a solution and voice concerns about effects on the urban environment.

The contracts between the State and the contractor were signed on October 31, 2006. They 
were ratified by the Parliament on February 8, 2007.

The project has a budget of 472 million euro, of which 66.5 million are to be provided by public and the rest by private funding. The operation of tolls will be granted to the contractor for a period of 30 years; the toll fee has been set at 0.90 euro.

Technical characteristics
The road is planned as a 6-lane expressway with a length of 6.5 kilometres, of which 4 kilometres will be in a tunnel. The roof of the tunnel will be at least one meter underneath the seabed. The western end will be at the port area and the eastern end will be close to the Makedonia Pallas hotel.

Upon the completion of the works, Leoforos Nikis (the seafront avenue), which currently receives heavy eastward traffic, is to be pedestrianised.

External links
Official press release from the Greek Ministry for the Environment, Physical Planning and Public Works (10 November 2006) regarding the project.

References

Proposed roads
Proposed undersea tunnels in Europe
Proposed buildings and structures in Greece
Proposed transport infrastructure in Greece